Riis is a surname. Notable people with the surname include:
 Asbjørn 'Bear' Riis (born 1957), Danish professional wrestler
 Bendik Riis (1911–1988), Norwegian artist
 Bjarne Riis (born 1964), Danish former professional road bicycle racer turned team owner and manager
 Einar Riis (1922–2006), Norwegian aircraft broker and consul in Rome
 Fredrik Riis (1789–1845), Norwegian county governor
 Hilde Riis (born 1959), Norwegian cross-country skier
 Jacob Riis (1849–1914), Danish-American journalist, photographer, and social reformer
 Nelson Riis (born 1942), Canadian businessman and former politician
 Povl Riis (born 1925), Danish gastroenterologist
 Sharon Riis (1947–2016), Canadian writer

Danish-language surnames
Norwegian-language surnames